Daniel Hayyim Cleif (1729 – 14 May 1794) was a Dutch-born Curonian rabbi.

Biography
Cleif was born in Amsterdam in 1729. He settled in Hasenpoth, Courland, originally as a jeweler; later he officiated there as rabbi for many years. At this time he wrote Arugah ketannah ('The Small Garden-Bed'), a booklet in which the 248 positive commandments are formulated in rime (Altona, 1787, and reprinted several times). He also left in manuscript a commentary on the Torah.

One of Cleif's sons was a physician in the service of the Russian government, with the title of councilor of state, who died in the Orel Governorate in 1846.

References

External links
 Works by Cleif at the National Library of Israel

1729 births
1794 deaths
18th-century Dutch rabbis
18th-century Polish–Lithuanian rabbis
Rabbis from Amsterdam
People from Aizpute
People from the Duchy of Courland and Semigallia